Tüvshinjargalyn Enkhjargal (born 14 June 1992) is a Mongolian racing cyclist and triathlete. In road cycling she won the individual time trial at the 2013 Asian Cycling Championships and finished 6th at the 2014 Asian Games. She competed in the 2013 UCI World Championships women's road race in Florence.

She also competes in triathlons and competed in the women's event at the 2010 Asian Games.

Major results

2013
 1st  Time trial, Asian Road Championships
2014
 Asian Road Championships
3rd  Time trial
8th Road race
2015
 National Road Championships
1st  Time trial
1st  Road race
 3rd  Time trial, Asian Road Championships
2016
 National Road Championships
1st  Time trial
1st  Road race
 Asian Road Championships
5th Time trial
8th Road race
2018
 National Road Championships
2nd Time trial
2nd Road race

References

External links
 

1992 births
Living people
Mongolian female cyclists
Cyclists at the 2014 Asian Games
Triathletes at the 2010 Asian Games
Triathletes at the 2010 Summer Youth Olympics
Mongolian female triathletes
Asian Games competitors for Mongolia
21st-century Mongolian women